Corynofrea nigritarsis is a species of beetle in the family Cerambycidae. It was described by Breuning in 1940.

Subspecies
 Corynofrea nigritarsis nigripes Breuning, 1977
 Corynofrea nigritarsis nigritarsis Breuning, 1940

References

Crossotini
Beetles described in 1940